Tuber magnatum, the white truffle, is a species of truffle in the order Pezizales and family Tuberaceae. It is found in southern Europe.

Distribution
It is found mainly in the Langhe and Montferrat areas of the Piedmont region in northern Italy and, most famously, in the countryside around the cities of Alba and Asti.  Acqualagna, in the northern part of the Marche near Urbino is another center for the production and commercialization of white truffles, and its annual festival is one of the most important in Italy. 

In recent years, the search for truffles became very popular in Bosnia and Herzegovina. Especially abundant occurrence is recorded in the regions of Vlašić, Lisina and Kozara, and lately, after discovery of its presence, in the western part of the Herzegovina region, around the village of Služanj and the town of Čitluk. Plans for cultivation are already taking shape, with foreign companies, considering the country's adequate climate, investing in local agriculture.

White truffles can also be found in Molise, Abruzzo and in the hills around San Miniato, in Tuscany. They are also found on the Istria peninsula, in Croatia in the Motovun forest along the Mirna river,  and in Slovenia along the Dragonja and Rizana river, as well as in the Drome area in France.

Habitat
Growing symbiotically with oak, hazel, poplar and beech and fruiting in autumn, they can reach  diameter and 500 g, though are usually much smaller. The flesh is pale cream or brown with white marbling.

Commercialisation
Italian white truffles are very highly esteemed and are the most valuable on the market. The white truffle market in Alba is busiest in the months of October and November when the Fiera del Tartufo (truffle fair) takes place.

In November 1999, what was then the largest truffle in the world was found near Buje, Croatia.

The record price paid for a single white truffle was set in December 2007, when Macau casino owner Stanley Ho paid $330,000 (£165,000) for a specimen weighing . One of the largest truffles found in decades, it was unearthed near Pisa, Italy, and sold at an auction held simultaneously in Macau, Hong Kong, and Florence. This record was then matched on November 27, 2010, when Ho again paid $330,000 for a pair of white truffles, including one weighing nearly a kilogram.

In December 2014, a white truffle weighing  was unearthed in the Umbrian region of Italy. It was auctioned by Sabatino Truffles at Sotheby's in New York. While some had expected it to sell for $1 million, it was sold for $61,000 to a Taiwanese buyer. In 2021, a white truffle from Piedmont weighing 830 g was sold for €103,000 at auction.

See also

References

magnatum
Truffles (fungi)
Fungi described in 1788